Piz Turettas (2,963 m) is a mountain of the Swiss Ortler Alps, overlooking Fuldera in the canton of Graubünden. It lies between the Val Mora and the Val Müstair.

References

External links
 Piz Turettas on Hikr

Mountains of the Alps
Mountains of Switzerland
Mountains of Graubünden
Ortler Alps
Val Müstair
Two-thousanders of Switzerland